Malaxis elegans is a species of terrestrial and semiepiphytic orchids.

References

External links 

Plants described in 1921
elegans